St. Peter an der Sperr was a Dominican convent church in Wiener Neustadt in Austria. The church building is now used as an exhibition space. The convent building now houses a museum.

In August 2016, during excavations in the run-up to planned conversion work for the 2019 Lower Austrian State Exhibition, archaeologists came across two medieval graves.

Gallery

References

Churches in Austria
Dominican convents